Kim Song-Guk (born April 11, 1984) is a North Korean boxer who competed in the featherweight (– 57 kg) at the 2004 Summer Olympics and won the silver medal.

Career
Southpaw Kim upset Vitali Tajbert at the Olympics 2004 but lost to Russian star Alexei Tichtchenko. He qualified for the Athens Games by ending up in first place at the 1st AIBA Asian 2004 Olympic Qualifying Tournament in Guangzhou, China. In the final he defeated Thailand's Somluck Kamsing.

At the Asian Games he lost to Bahodirjon Sooltonov in the semis and won bronze.

Amateur highlights
2004 Olympic Games
1st round bye
Defeated Konstantine Kupatadze (Georgia) 25-14
Defeated Muideen Ganiyu (Nigeria) 32-11
Defeated Vitali Tajbert (Germany) 29-24
Lost to Alexei Tichtchenko (Russia) 17-39

2007 AIBA World Amateur Championships
Defeated Otoneil Ortiz (Virgin Islands) RSC 2 (0:57)
Defeated Alejandro Rodríguez (Spain) RSC 3 (1:49)
Defeated Vazgen Safar-Yants (Belarus) 19-18
Defeated Darley Perez (Colombia) 23-6
Lost to Domenico Valentino (Italy) 14-22

2008 Olympic Games
Lost to Daouda Sow (France) 3-13

References

1984 births
Living people
Boxers at the 2004 Summer Olympics
Boxers at the 2008 Summer Olympics
Olympic silver medalists for North Korea
Olympic boxers of North Korea
Olympic medalists in boxing
Medalists at the 2004 Summer Olympics
Asian Games medalists in boxing
Boxers at the 2002 Asian Games
Boxers at the 2006 Asian Games
North Korean male boxers
AIBA World Boxing Championships medalists
Asian Games bronze medalists for North Korea
Medalists at the 2006 Asian Games
Featherweight boxers
21st-century North Korean people